The Walls of Jerusalem surround the Old City of Jerusalem (approx. 1 km2). In 1535, when Jerusalem was part of the Ottoman Empire, Sultan Suleiman I ordered the ruined city walls to be rebuilt. The work took some four years, between 1537 and 1541. The walls are visible on most old maps of Jerusalem over the last 1,500 years.

The walls contain 34 watchtowers and seven main gates open for traffic, with two minor gates reopened by archaeologists.

In 1981, the Jerusalem walls were added, along with the Old City of Jerusalem, to the UNESCO World Heritage Site list.

Pre-Israelite city
The city of Jerusalem has been surrounded by defensive walls since ancient times. In the Middle Bronze Age, a period also known in biblical terms as the era of the Patriarchs, a city named Jebus was built on the southeastern hill of Jerusalem, relatively small (50,000 square meters) but well fortified. Remains of its walls are located above the Siloam Tunnel. The identification of Jebus with Jerusalem has been disputed, principally by Niels Peter Lemche. Supporting his case, every non-biblical mention of Jerusalem found in the ancient Near East refers to the city as 'Jerusalem'. Also in the Amarna letters, it is called Beth-Shalem, the house of Shalem.

Israelite city (ca. 1000–587/86 BCE)

According to Jewish tradition, as expressed in the Tanakh, Jerusalem remained a Jebusite city until the rise of David, who conquered Jebus, renamed it City of David and started expanding it. His city was still located on the low southeastern hill, outside today's Old City area. Solomon, David's son, built the First Temple on the hilltop rising right above the city he had inherited, the Temple Mount, and then extended the city walls in order to protect the temple.

During the First Temple period the city walls were extended to include the northwest hill as well, i.e. the area where today's Jewish and Armenian Quarter (Jerusalem) Quarters are located.

The entire city was destroyed in 587/86 BCE during the siege led by Nebuchadnezzar of Babylon.

Jewish postexilic city
After the Babylonian captivity and the Persian conquest of Babylonia, Cyrus II of Persia allowed the Jews to return to Judea and rebuild the Temple. The construction was finished in 516 BCE or 430 BCE. Then, Artaxerxes I or possibly Darius II allowed Ezra and Nehemiah to return and rebuild the city's walls and to govern Judea, which was ruled as Yehud province under the Persians. During the Second Temple period, especially during the Hasmonean period, the city walls were expanded and renovated, constituting what Josephus calls the First Wall. Herod the Great added what Josephus called the Second Wall somewhere in the area between today's Jaffa Gate and Temple Mount. Agrippa I (r. 41–44 CE) later began the construction of the Third Wall, which was completed just at the beginning of the First Jewish–Roman War. Some remains of this wall are located today near the Mandelbaum Gate gas station.

Aelia Capitolina and Byzantine Jerusalem

In 70 CE, as a result of the Roman siege during the First Jewish–Roman War, the walls were almost completely destroyed. Jerusalem would remain in ruins for some six decades and without protective walls for over two centuries.

The pagan Roman city, Aelia Capitolina, which was built after 130 by Emperor Hadrian, was at first left without protective walls. After some two centuries without walls, a new set was erected around the city, probably during the reign of Emperor Diocletian, sometime between 289 and the turn of the century. The walls were extensively renewed by the Empress Aelia Eudocia during her banishment to Jerusalem (443–460).

Middle Ages

In 1033, most of the walls constructed by Eudocia were destroyed by an earthquake. They had to be rebuilt by the Fatimids, who left out the southernmost parts that had been previously included: Mount Zion with its churches, and the southeastern hill (the City of David) with the Jewish neighborhoods which stood south of the Temple Mount. In preparation for the expected Crusader siege of 1099, the walls were strengthened yet again but to little avail. The conquest brought some destruction followed by reconstruction, as did the reconquest by Saladin in 1187. In 1202 to 1212 Saladin's nephew, Al-Malik al-Mu'azzam 'Isa, ordered the reconstruction of the city walls, but later on, in 1219, he reconsidered the situation after most of the watchtowers had been built and had the walls torn down, mainly because he feared that the Crusaders would benefit of the fortifications if they managed to reconquer the city. For the next three centuries, the city remained without protective walls, the Temple Mount/Haram ash-Sharif and the citadel then being the only well-fortified areas.

Ottoman period
In the 16th century, during the reign of the Ottoman Empire in the region, Sultan Suleiman the Magnificent decided to rebuild the city walls fully, partly on the remains of the ancient walls. Being built in circa 1537–1541, they are the walls that exist today.

An inscription in Arabic from the reign of Suleiman the Magnificent states:
Has decreed the construction of the wall he who has protected the home of Islam with his might and main and wiped out the tyranny of idols with his power and strength, he whom alone God has enabled to enslave the necks of kings in countries (far and wide) and deservedly acquire the throne of the Caliphate, the Sultan son of the Sultan son of the Sultan son of the Sultan, Suleyman.

Qasr Jalud

At the northwest corner of the Ottoman wall, archaeologists have discovered the meager remains of a large tower, c. 35x35 metres, probably first built in the 11th century during the Fatimid period, that fell to the Franks at the end of the First Crusade in 1099, and was apparently expanded by the Ayyubids after Saladin's reconquest of the city in 1187. The tower is known in Arabic as Qasr al-Jalud (Goliath's Tower), and to the Crusaders as Turris Tancredi (Latin for Tancred's Tower), after Tancred of Hauteville, the commander whose troops breached the Fatimid defenses at this specific point during the 1099 siege. The tower as well as the entire city wall were long destroyed by the time the Ottoman Turks built theirs, possibly since 1219 when Ayyubid ruler Al-Mu'azzam Isa razed most of the city fortifications.

See also
 Clifford Holliday, Mandate-period architect who drew up a master plan for Jerusalem and the restoration of the Old City walls.
 Broad Wall (Jerusalem) – city wall of Jerusalem from the time of Hezekiah (ca. 700 BCE)
 City gates of the Old City of Jerusalem
 Southern Wall of the Temple Mount
 Western Wall – also known as the Wailing Wall, the accessible part of the western retaining wall of the Temple Mount
 Walls of Jerusalem National Park – a national park in Tasmania Australia named after the Walls of Jerusalem for having natural rock formations that resemble the Walls

References

Jerusalem
World Heritage Sites in Asia
World Heritage Sites in the State of Palestine
Buildings and structures in Jerusalem
Tourist attractions in Jerusalem